Pseudomonas rhodesiae is a Gram-negative, rod-shaped bacterium isolated from natural mineral waters. Based on 16S rRNA analysis, P. rhodesiae has been placed in the P. fluorescens group.

References

External links
Type strain of Pseudomonas rhodesiae at BacDive -  the Bacterial Diversity Metadatabase

Pseudomonadales
Bacteria described in 1997